Guy Hubert Mamihasindrahona (born 25 August 1979 in Antananarivo) is a Malagasy footballer.

International career
He is a member of Madagascar national football team in 2007 to 2010.

References

External links
 
 

1979 births
Living people
Malagasy footballers
Association football utility players
Guy Hubert
Guy Hubert
Guy Hubert
Guy Hubert
Guy Hubert
Malagasy expatriate footballers
Guy Hubert
Malagasy expatriate sportspeople in Thailand
Expatriate footballers in Thailand
Madagascar international footballers
Association football central defenders